James Alexander Grant Smith (16 October 1937 – 10 April 2002) was a Scottish footballer who played as a central defender for Preston North End and Stockport County.

Smith was signed by Preston from his hometown club in 1956, making his first-team debut in the 1958-59 season.

Smith played in the 1964 FA Cup Final.

References

External links

1937 births
2002 deaths
Scottish footballers
Association football central defenders
Preston North End F.C. players
Stockport County F.C. players
People from Arbroath
English Football League players
Footballers from Angus, Scotland
FA Cup Final players